Antarches tessmanni is a moth of the family Pterophoridae that is known from  Cameroon, Comoros, Congo, Equatorial Guinea, Ghana, Guinea, Ivory Coast, Madagascar, Malawi, Mauritius, Réunion, South Africa, Tanzania, Uganda, Yemen and Zimbabwe.

The larvae feed on Cinchona pubescens (Rubiaceae).

References

Exelastini
Moths described in 1912
Moths of Africa
Moths of Madagascar
Moths of Réunion